Madina Colony is a neighborhood in the Karachi Central district of Karachi, Pakistan. It was previously administered as part of New Karachi Town, which was disbanded in 2011.

There are several ethnic groups in Madina Colony and they include Muhajirs, Sindhis, Kashmiris, Seraikis, Pakhtuns, Balochis, Memons, Bohras,  Ismailis, etc.

References

External links 
 Karachi Website.

Neighbourhoods of Karachi
New Karachi Town
Karachi Central District